Alexander Popham (c. 1670 – 16 June 1705), of Littlecote House, Littlecote, Wiltshire, and St. James's Square, London, was an English politician.

He was the only son of Sir Francis Popham of Littlecote Park.

Popham was a Member (MP) of the Parliament of England for Chippenham in 1690–1698 and for Bath from 1698 until his death on 16 June 1705.

He married Anne Montagu, daughter of Ralph Montagu, 1st Duke of Montagu. Their daughter, Elizabeth (died 20 March 1761), married firstly Edward Montagu, Viscount Hinchingbrooke, and secondly Francis Seymour, of Sherborne, Dorset.

References

1670 births
1705 deaths
People from Wiltshire
Politicians from London
Members of Parliament for Chippenham
English MPs 1690–1695
English MPs 1695–1698
English MPs 1698–1700
English MPs 1701
English MPs 1701–1702
English MPs 1702–1705